Cerbera is a genus of evergreen small trees or shrubs, native to tropical Asia, Australia, Madagascar, and various islands in the Indian Ocean and the western Pacific Ocean.

Three trees of this genus are mangroves, Cerbera floribunda, Cerbera manghas and Cerbera odollam.

Description
The leaves are alternate and lack interpetiolar stipules. The tubular corollas are actinomorphic, i.e. they are symmetric and can be divided in halves along any diameter.
All trees contain a white latex. The fruits are drupes.

The genus is named after Cerberus because all its parts are poisonous : they contain cerberin, a cardiac glycoside, a substance that blocks electric impulses in the body (including the beating of the heart). Therefore, it is advised to avoid using wood from Cerbera species due to their toxicity, and as their smoke may cause lethal poisoning.

The genus is related to Cerberiopsis, endemic to New Caledonia.

Species
The World Checklist of Selected Plant Families includes:
Cerbera dilatata Markgraf. - Chiute - Mariana Islands
 Cerbera dumicola P.I.Forst. - Queensland
 Cerbera floribunda K. Schumann – Cassowary Plum - Queensland, New Guinea, Maluku, Sulawesi, Solomon Islands, Bismarck Archipelago, Micronesia
 Cerbera inflata S.T. Blake – Grey Milkwood, Milky Pine - Queensland, Papua New Guinea, Bismarck Archipelago
 Cerbera laeta A.J.M.Leeuwenberg - Papua New Guinea
 Cerbera manghas L. - Tanzania, Madagascar, Comoros, Seychelles, Mauritius, India, Sri Lanka, Bangladesh, S China, Ryukyu Islands, Andaman & Nicobar Islands, Indochina, insular Southeast Asia, N Australia, numerous Pacific islands
 Cerbera odollam Gaertn. – Suicide Tree - India, Sri Lanka, Bangladesh, Andaman & Nicobar Islands, Indochina, insular Southeast Asia, Queensland, numerous Pacific islands

formerly included
 Cerbera obovata Roem. &  Schult. = Craspidospermum verticillatum Bojer ex Decne.  
 Cerbera oppositifolia Lam. = Ochrosia oppositifolia (Lam.) K.Schum.

References

Gallery

 
Apocynaceae genera